The red-headed Amazon side-necked turtle, red-headed river turtle or red-headed sideneck (Podocnemis erythrocephala) is a species of turtle in the family Podocnemididae. It is found in the Amazon basin in Brazil, Colombia, and Venezuela.

References

External links

 Tortoise & Freshwater Turtle Specialist Group 1996.   IUCN Red List: Podocnemis erythrocephala . downloaded on 29 July 2007.
All IUCN Red List of Threatened Species

Podocnemis
Turtles of South America
Fauna of the Amazon
Reptiles of Brazil
Reptiles of Colombia
Reptiles of Venezuela
Vulnerable animals
Vulnerable biota of South America
Reptiles described in 1824
Taxonomy articles created by Polbot